The Royal Museum for Central Africa (RMCA), also officially known as the AfricaMuseum, is an ethnography and natural history museum situated in Tervuren in Flemish Brabant, Belgium, just outside Brussels. It was built to showcase King Leopold II's Congo Free State in the International Exposition of 1897.

The museum focuses on the Congo, a former Belgian colony. The sphere of interest, however, especially in biological research, extends to the whole Congo River basin, Middle Africa, East Africa, and West Africa, attempting to integrate "Africa" as a whole. Intended originally as a colonial museum, from 1960 onwards it has focused more on ethnography and anthropology. Like most museums, it houses a research department in addition to its public exhibit department. Not all research pertains to Africa (e.g. research on the archaeozoology of Sagalassos, Turkey). Some researchers have strong ties with the Royal Belgian Institute of Natural Sciences.

In November 2013, the museum closed for extensive renovation work, including the construction of new exhibition space, and re-opened in December 2018.

History

International Exposition (1897)
After the Congo Free State was recognised by the Berlin Conference of 1884–85, King Leopold II wanted to publicise the civilising mission and the economic opportunities available in his private colony to a wider public, both in Belgium and internationally. After considering other places, the king decided to have a temporary exhibition in his royal estate in Tervuren, just east of Brussels, in today's province of Flemish Brabant.

When the 1897 International Exposition was held in Brussels, a colonial section was built in Tervuren, connected to the city centre by the monumental Avenue de Tervueren/Tervurenlaan. The Brussels–Tervuren tram line 44 was built at the same time as the original museum by Leopold II to bring the visitors from the city centre to the colonial exhibition. The building was designed by the French architect Alfred-Philibert Aldrophe and the classical gardens by the French landscape architect Elie Lainé. In the main hall, known as the Hall of the Great Cultures, the architect and decorator  designed a distinctive wooden Art Nouveau structure to evoke a Congolese forest, using Bilinga wood, an African tree. The exhibition displayed ethnographic objects, stuffed animals and Congolese export products (e.g. coffee, cacao and tobacco). In the park, a temporary "human zoo"—a copy of an African village—was built, in which 60 Congolese people lived for the duration of the exhibition. Seven of them, however, did not survive their forced stay in Belgium.

Development of the museum
This exhibition's success led to the permanent establishment, in 1898, of the Museum of the Congo, and a permanent exhibition was installed in the Palace of the Colonies. A decade later, in 1912, a small, similar museum—the —was opened in Namur. The museum began to support academic research, but due to the avid collecting of the scientists, the collection soon grew too large for the museum and enlargement was needed. Tervuren, which had become a rich suburb of Brussels, was chosen as the location of the enlarged museum. The new museum started construction in 1904 and was designed by the French architect Charles Girault in neoclassical "palace" architecture, reminiscent of the Petit Palais in Paris, with large gardens extending into the Tervuren Forest (a part of the Sonian Forest). It was officially opened in 1910, a year after the death of Leopold II, by his successor, King Albert I, and named the Museum of the Belgian Congo.

The following years saw the consolidation and enlargement of the museum's collections. In 1934, the museum's herbarium was transferred to the National Botanic Garden of Belgium (today's Meise Botanic Garden in Meise, Flemish Brabant). In 1952, the adjective "Royal" was added to the museum's name. In 1960, following the independence of the Congo, the museum's name was changed to its current name: the Royal Museum for Central Africa ( or KMMA,  or MRAC,  or KMZA).

Renovation (2013–2018)
By the turn of the millennium, the museum was in need of a thorough renovation. The more than 100-year-old central building was no longer adapted to the needs of a current museum operation. Besides, the permanent exhibition was outdated and its presentation not very critical of the colonial history. A new scenography was thus urgently required.

A global master plan was drawn up in 2007 for the entire site. The Belgian Buildings Agency entrusted the plan to the Temporary Association Stéphane Beel Architects (TV SBA). In late 2013, the museum was closed to allow a major renovation of its exhibits and an extension. The Belgian Government spent €66 million on the museum's modernisation. The additional space allowed contemporary art from Central Africa to be displayed alongside the original colonial exhibits. Renamed AfricaMuseum, the museum was reopened on 9 December 2018.

Buildings
The current AfricaMuseum complex consists of six buildings. The centrally located main building houses the permanent exhibitions. It was built under Leopold II by the French architect Charles Girault. The facade is decorated in the style of the neoclassical French grand palaces. On the right (south-west) side of this imposing building is the Executive Pavilion, and on the left (north-east), the Stanley Pavilion, which houses the entire Stanley Archive. The former  (now the Palace of Africa) has been transformed into a reception centre, media library and banquet hall. The  (CAPA) building, erected in 1957 for the African staff, houses several scientific departments.

Following the museum's complete renovation, a part of the previously scattered archives are now presented in new on-site exhibition spaces. A reception pavilion, newly built in 2016, between the management building and the Palace of Africa, functions as the entrance building. In this building are the ticket offices, cloakrooms, a shop, a restaurant, as well as a picnic area for children. An underground gallery leads from the reception building into the existing museum building. This space is also used for temporary exhibitions. In the museum's enclosed courtyard, a sunken garden with a light shaft was added, bringing light to this underground level.

Collections
The AfricaMuseum houses collections that are unique in the world, of which only a small proportion can be exhibited. According to the museum's website, the objects and animals on display in the main building make up less than 5% of the total museum's collection:
 The Department of Zoology has over 10,000,000 specimens, including 6,000,000 insects and 1,000,000 fish.
 The Department of Geology and Mineralogy holds more than 56,000 wood samples in its xylotheque, as well as 200,000 rock samples and 17,000 minerals.
 The Department of Cultural Anthropology can boast of 120,000 ethnographic objects (1,600 of which are in the exhibition rooms). The ethnomusicology collection comprises 8,000 musical instruments, as well as 2,500 hours of recordings of traditional music from sub-Saharan Africa, in particular in Central Africa (Congo, Rwanda and Burundi), of which the oldest dates back to 1910 (wax Edison scrolls). Additionally, more than 500,000 films and photos are kept in the film and photo libraries.
 Finally, the Department of History and General Scientific Services manages thousands of historical objects and 350 archives, including some of Henry Morton Stanley's journals. Some of the collections are digitally accessible.

The herbarium collection of the then-Congo Museum was transferred to that of the National Botanic Garden of Belgium in 1934.

Archives
The museum stores archives documenting its own institutional history, as well as archives of private businesses, organisations, and individuals.

Research
The publicly accessible exhibitions only represent about 25 percent of the museum's activities. The scientific departments, which represent the bulk of the museum's academic and research facilities, together with the main collections, are housed in the former , the Stanley Pavilion and in the CAPA building.

There are 4 departments:
Department of Cultural Anthropology
Ethnography
Archaeology and Prehistory
Linguistics and Ethnomusicology
Anthropology and Ethnohistory
Department of Geology and Mineralogy
General Geology
Mineralogy and Petrography
Cartography and Photo interpretation
Physical and Mineral chemistry
Department of Zoology
Vertebrates (Ornithology, Ichthyology, Herpetology, Osteology and Mammalogy)
Entomology
Invertebrates non-insects (Arachnology, Myriapodology, Acarology)
Department of History and General Scientific Services
History of the Colonial Period
Contemporary History
Agricultural and Forest economics (Geomorphology, Laboratory of Wood Biology)

The museum also maintains a library of some 130,000 titles. In the context of discussions about the restitution of cultural objects in museum collections of colonial origin, the AfricaMuseum started to publicly present information about the provenance of such objects in its permanent exhibition in 2021.

Controversy

There has been controversy surrounding the Royal Museum for Central Africa. It had previously been called a museum that "has remained frozen in time". No mention was made of the pillage of resources and atrocities in the Congo Free State, nor during Belgium's larger colonial era. The Guardian reported in July 2002 that, after initial outrage by Belgian historians over the popular history book King Leopold's Ghost by Adam Hochschild that gives his view of the Congo Free State in what some critics called a "tendentious diatribe", the state-funded museum would finance an investigation into Hochschild's allegations.

The resulting, more modern exhibition The Memory of Congo (February–October 2005) tried to tell the story of the Congo Free State before it became a Belgian colony and a less one-sided view of the Belgian colonial era. The exhibition was praised by the international press, with French newspaper Le Monde claiming that "the museum has done better than revisit a particularly stormy page in history...[it] has pushed the public to join it in looking into the reality of colonialism." Hochschild himself had a mixed critique of the renovated museum.

Gallery

See also
 Atrocities in the Congo Free State
 Belgian Federal Science Policy Office (BELSPO)
 Brussels Anti-Slavery Conference 1889–90
 Brussels Conference Act of 1890
 Archives Africaines of the Belgian SPF Affaires étrangères, Commerce extérieur et Coopération au Développement
 Belgium in "the long nineteenth century"

References

Notes

Bibliography

Issued by the museum

About the museum
in English
 
 
 
 

in other languages

External links

 Official museum site
 Collection etnomusicology

Palaces in Belgium
Museums in Flemish Brabant
Natural history museums
African art museums
Museums established in 1898
1898 establishments in Belgium
Ethnographic museums in Europe
Art museums and galleries in Belgium
Forestry museums
Forestry in Belgium
Central Africa
Organisations based in Belgium with royal patronage
Tervuren
Leopold II of Belgium
Belgian colonisation in Africa
Congo Free State
Archives in Belgium
World's fair architecture in Belgium